{{DISPLAYTITLE:C20H42}}
The molecular formula C20H42 may refer to:

 Crocetane, or 2,6,11,15-tetramethylhexadecane, a diterpenoid alkane
 Icosane, an alkane hydrocarbon
 Phytane, a diterpenoid alkane

Molecular formulas